Paul A. Russo (born July 21, 1943) is an American diplomat. He was Ambassador of the United States to Barbados, Dominica, St Lucia, Antigua, St. Vincent, and St. Christopher-Nevis-Anguilla from 1986 to 1988, under Ronald Reagan.

Biography
Russo was born July 21, 1943 in Cleveland, Ohio.  He holds a B.A. from Ohio State University, as well as degrees from Case Western Reserve University and Georgetown University.

Russo was President of Capitol Consultants, Inc. From 1973 to 1975, he was Special Assistant to California Governor Ronald Reagan. In 1978, he founded and was named Executive Director and Treasurer of Campaign America, chaired by U.S. Senator Bob Dole. He went on to serve as Special Assistant to the President for Political Affairs from 1981 to 1983, and later as Deputy Under Secretary of Labor. He was later appointed by Ronald Reagan as Ambassador of the United States to Barbados, Dominica, St Lucia, Antigua, St. Vincent, and St. Christopher-Nevis-Anguilla from 1986 to 1988.

In 1991, he taught a course on the modern US presidency at Georgetown University's School for Continuing Education.

Russo currently serves as president on the Board of Layalina Productions and Paul Russo & Associates. Moreover, he has been a member of the Council of American Ambassadors, the Eastern International Academy, the National Easter Seal Society, the National Commission for Employment Policy and the Federal Advisory Council on Unemployment Insurance.

References

|-

|-

|-

|-

|-

1943 births
Living people
Ambassadors of the United States to Antigua and Barbuda
Ambassadors of the United States to Barbados
Ambassadors of the United States to Dominica
Ambassadors of the United States to Saint Lucia
Ambassadors of the United States to Saint Kitts and Nevis
Ambassadors of the United States to Saint Vincent and the Grenadines
Case Western Reserve University alumni
Georgetown University alumni
Georgetown University faculty
Ohio State University alumni
People from Cleveland
20th-century American diplomats